The City Council of Singapore was the administrative council of the City of Singapore responsible for the provision of water, electricity, gas, roads and bridges and street lighting. 

It was dissolved in 1959 when Singapore attained self-governance from the British Empire, and it was subsequently abolished upon Singapore's independence from Malaysia in 1965. 

The first fully elected council was elected in 1957, followed with a by-election in 1958. Prior to 1957, franchise was limited and there were appointed members.

It signed the Tebrau and Scudai Rivers Water Agreement and the Johor River Water Agreement with the Johore State Government of Malaya in 1961 and 1962 respectively.

History
As a British colony, Singapore was conferred city status by a royal charter from King George VI in 1951, when Singapore was then a Crown colony of the United Kingdom. The original Municipal Council was therefore renamed City Council, and the Municipal Building was renamed City Hall. In 1965, upon Singapore's expulsion from Malaysia, the Republic of Singapore Independence Act 1965 provided the following clause

that empowered the President to abolish the City Council and the Rural Board, with the powers of the local authorities assumed by the government. The City Council of the City of Singapore and the Singapore Rural Board were abolished in 1965. Ong Eng Guan was Singapore's first elected mayor in 1957 and continued to run the City Council from December 1957 till April 1959.

Elections
Prior to the 1957 City Council elections, franchise was limited and the council was party appointed. From 1949 to 1953 there were 6 seats on council:

 1949 (April 2)
 1949 (November 7)
 1950 (December 2)
 1951 (December 1)
 1952 (December 6)
 1953 (December 5)

After 1953 the yearly elections ended and the council term lasted 4 years. 
The elections in 1957 and 1958 eliminate all appointed seats on council. The number of seats increased to 32 for the last two elections before council was abolished in 1959.

See also
Pekanbaru
Elections in Singapore
History of Singapore
City Hall (Singapore)
Singapore Municipal Commission

References
>

History of Singapore
Singapore